Nelson is a town in Cheshire County, New Hampshire, United States. The population was 629 at the 2020 census, down from 729 at the 2010 census. Nelson includes the village of Munsonville.

History

Originally named "Monadnock No. 6", the town was granted in 1752 by Governor Benning Wentworth. It was first settled in 1767 by Breed Batchelder. On February 22, 1774, the town was incorporated by Governor John Wentworth as "Packersfield", after a major proprietor, Thomas Packer, the sheriff at Portsmouth, New Hampshire. The name was changed in 1814 to Nelson in honor of Viscount Horatio Nelson, British admiral and naval hero.

Located on the height of land separating the watersheds of the Connecticut and Merrimack rivers, Nelson became primarily an agricultural community. The uneven surface proved good for grazing. But with streams rising from four ponds to provide water power, it also developed industry. The village of Munsonville, situated on the stage line at the outlet of Granite Lake, manufactured cotton cloth and chairs. The L. J. Colony Chair Co. produced between 25,000 and 30,000 chairs annually, hiring women and children from local farms to weave the rattan seats and backs. At one time, Munsonville had 1,000 homesteads and 10 school districts. The mills have since closed, and Munsonville is today a resort of summer homes.

Nelson is the home of a popular Monday night contradance. Similar dances have been held for over 200 years in Nelson's town hall. Many make the claim that this is the longest running public contradance in the world, though there have been no attempts to document this as an "official" record. The Apple Hill Center for Chamber Music, a classical chamber music group which attempts to bring members of cultures in conflict (such as Israelis and Palestinians) closer together through music, is also in Nelson.

Geography
Nelson is located in the eastern part of Cheshire County, in southwestern New Hampshire. Its eastern border is the Hillsborough County line. The eastern part of the town drains towards the Contoocook River, a tributary of the Merrimack River and part of the Gulf of Maine watershed, while the western part of the town feeds tributaries of the Ashuelot River, part of the Connecticut River watershed draining to Long Island Sound. Spoonwood Pond and part of Nubanusit Lake are in the east. Part of Silver Lake is in the south, and part of Granite Lake is in the north. The village of Munsonville is located at the outlet of Granite Lake.

The town is crossed by the Monadnock-Sunapee Greenway, a  hiking trail that traverses the highlands of southern New Hampshire from Mount Monadnock in Jaffrey to Mount Sunapee in Newbury. The trail passes directly through the center of Nelson.

The town is crossed by New Hampshire Route 9.

Adjacent municipalities
 Stoddard (north)
 Antrim (northeast)
 Hancock (east)
 Harrisville (south)
 Roxbury (southwest)
 Sullivan (west)

Demographics

As of the census of 2010, there were 729 people, 303 households, and 208 families residing in the town. The population density was 33.3 people per square mile (12.9/km). There were 460 housing units, of which 157, or 34.1%, were vacant. 144 of the vacant units were for seasonal or recreational use. The racial makeup of the town was 97.7% White, 0.0% African American, 0.0% Native American, 0.5% Asian, and 1.8% from two or more races. Hispanic or Latino of any race were 1.4% of the population.

Of the 303 households in the town, 26.4% had children under the age of 18 living with them, 52.8% were headed by married couples living together, 8.9% had a female householder with no husband present, and 31.4% were non-families. 24.8% of all households were made up of individuals, and 8.6% were someone living alone who was 65 years of age or older. The average household size was 2.41, and the average family size was 2.79.

19.1% of the town population were under the age of 18, 9.1% were from 18 to 24, 20.1% were from 25 to 44, 35.3% were from 45 to 64, and 16.3% were 65 years of age or older. The median age was 46.2 years. For every 100 females, there were 105.9 males. For every 100 females age 18 and over, there were 102.1 males.

For the period 2013–2017, the estimated median annual income for a household in the town was $71,500, and the median income for a family was $90,313. Male full-time workers had a median income of $48,000 versus $48,542 for females. The per capita income for the town was $38,514. About 12.4% of families and 13.2% of the population were below the poverty line, including 18.0% of those under age 18.

Notable people 

 Ursula Newell Emerson (1806–1888), missionary in Hawaii
 Alfred B. Kittredge (1861–1911), US senator from South Dakota
 Ralph Page (1903–1985), contra dance caller and authority on American folk dance
 May Sarton (1912–1995), poet, writer

References

External links
 
 Olivia Rodham Memorial Library
 Apple Hill Center for Chamber Music
 New Hampshire Economic and Labor Market Information Bureau Profile

 
Towns in Cheshire County, New Hampshire
Populated places established in 1774
Towns in New Hampshire